See also Flying Phantom.

 is a 1969 anime feature film directed by Hiroshi Ikeda and produced by Toei Animation. It was one of the first anime films to be dubbed into Russian and shown in Soviet cinema theaters. The animation and design work on the giant robot was done by the then-largely-unknown Hayao Miyazaki.

On May 28, 2022, it was announced Discotek Media will release the film on Blu-ray and will produce an English dub.

Plot

Hayato's home city is under attack from a gigantic robot. His parents are lying dead in the rubble and the only remaining friend is his dog. His only thought now is revenge against the owner of the Phantom Ship (from where the robot said he was sent).

He ends up in the house of Kuroshio, the leader of the fight against the Phantom Ship and the most important person in the city. By complete accident, Hayato finds his way to an underground passageway where he realizes that the true nature of events does not mesh with what Kuroshio has told him.

His life is now in great danger, and only he can stop the plans of the evildoers.

Cast

References

External links
 Official page
 
 

1969 anime films
Anime with original screenplays
Shotaro Ishinomori
Toei Animation films
Toei Company films